Jesús Alejandro Palacios Olague (born 7 February 1983) is a retired footballer, who played for Club Universidad de Guadalajara in the Liga MX.

Career
Born in Monterrey, Palacios began his professional football career with local side Tigres UANL, making his Liga MX debut in August 2003. After five years playing for Tigres, Palacios joined rivals Club Necaxa. In December 2008, Necaxa sent him on a six-month loan to San Luis.

References

External links
Profile at BDFA

1983 births
Living people
Footballers from Nuevo León
Mexico under-20 international footballers
Liga MX players
Tigres UANL footballers
San Luis F.C. players
Club Necaxa footballers
Leones Negros UdeG footballers
La Piedad footballers
Sportspeople from Monterrey
Association football midfielders
Mexican footballers